First Milk is a company based in the United Kingdom that supplies milk, cheese and other dairy products. It is a farmer owned co operative, that had about 2,200 members from 2010 to 2011. The company supplies products, to the United Kingdom and international markets.

History
Jim Paice became the company's chairperson in November 2012. At this time, the companies revenue was £579m. The company delayed dividend payments to help cash flow problems in January 2015, due to lack of demand. The company made about seventy redundancies in June the same year. The company was the ninth largest dairy company in the United Kingdom in 2019, based on turnover.

Products
The company owns the brands The Lake District Dairy Co, Pembrokeshire Cheddar, Mull of Kintyre, Scottish Pride and Isle of Arran.

References

Dairy farming in the United Kingdom
Co-operatives in the United Kingdom
Dairy products companies of the United Kingdom
Dairy cooperatives